Phina Oruche  (born 31 August 1969) is a Nigerian British actress, radio presenter and former model best known for her performances as Liberty Baker in ITV's Footballers' Wives, for which she won a Screen Nations Award for Favourite TV Star.

Early life
Oruche was born in Liverpool, England, to Nigerian parents of Igbo descent.

Early career
Oruche began her career as a fashion model. In London before she emigrated to New York City. She represented Gap for five years in the United States, and was featured as a cover model on many US magazines. She had a special relationship with Essence magazine and was often featured on its pages and on a cover. She was discovered for the TV screen by British film director Tony Kaye, who featured her in many of his TV commercials, giving rise to her continued desire to act professionally.

Acting
In July 2020 Oruche appeared as Aunt Venn in poignant BBC1 drama “Anthony” directed by Terry McDonaugh for LA Productions and simultaneously starred as Marvellous in BBC’s “ Taken Down” directed by BAFTA-winning David Caffrey for Spiral pictures. Oruche started her acting career in the US after an education in the Actors Studio in Los Angeles. She is best known for her role as Liberty Baker in Footballers' Wives, for which she won a Screen Nations award. She has appeared in American and British television shows including The Bill, Nip/Tuck, Charmed, Buffy the Vampire Slayer, Diagnosis Murder, NYPD Blue and The Unit. Her film credits include The Forsaken (2001) and Happy Ever Afters (2009).

She made a cameo appearance in a January 2008 episode of the British sketch comedy show Little Miss Jocelyn.

On 29 March 2010, it was revealed she had been cast to play Gabby Sharpe, the mother of a new family, in teen soap Hollyoaks.

On 1 November 2012 she made a return to television on the BBC1 drama Doctors, before taking five years off to focus on raising her son.

Other television appearances
In 2012 she featured as the celebrity bedtime story reader, reading a story a day for children during the week of the Queen's Diamond Jubilee. Oruche also featured as a special correspondent on North West Tonight, reporting on the 30-year anniversary of the Toxteth riots.

In Dublin, Oruche presented a show three days a week on Ireland AM for TV3 and in London as a continued regular panellist on the morning discussion programme The Wright Stuff she was "Babe in the Booth" for the week starting 29 April 2008, when she was 36 weeks pregnant.

Oruche lives in her native Liverpool, where she has presented and produced the Saturday-night radio programme Upfront on BBC Radio Merseyside. She has produced and hosted six Upfront Live shows for BBC Merseyside in Liverpool, at The Brink a non-alcoholic bar in Liverpool that she supports. Local singers such as Kof, Chelcee Grimes, Mic Lowry, Chi Temu  and Jamie Broad performed on the show.

Identity Crisis
Her one-woman Identity Crisis, based on her own life story, received its debut at the Edinburgh Festival Fringe in 2016, subsequently playing in 2017 at the International Slavery Museum in Liverpool, before its first London run at the Kennington Ovalhouse.
Identity Crisis finished its run in Soho Playhouse NYC.

Other professional activities
Oruche hosted Merseyside Black History Month Achievers Awards at St George's, Hall Liverpool, and a MOBO music panel, featuring local artists Eddie Amoo of The Real Thing, and Kof.

A published writer, her children’s book series “Jacopo Jacopo Football Star” and “Jacopo Jacopo on Lockdown” about a 10-year-old mixed heritage boy from Liverpool and his quest to become a premier league football player, are both on Amazon both published in 2020 during the COVID-19 lockdown. Oruche had a weekly column in the Liverpool Echo. Her autobiography Liberating Character was published in April 2012.

She also has a film company called Ibo Girl Productions, for which she directs, edits and produces digital shorts and videos.

Personal life
Oruche was married in August 2007, and she and her husband have one child.

Oruche ran the 2007 and 2006 London Marathons, raising £35,000 for the Anthony Nolan Trust.

References

External links
 
 Official website

1972 births
English people of Igbo descent
English people of Nigerian descent
English soap opera actresses
Living people
Black British actresses
Black British fashion people
Actresses from Liverpool
I'm a Celebrity...Get Me Out of Here! (British TV series) participants
Igbo people
 British emigrants to Nigeria